Steven van der Heijden (born 26 April 1999) is a Dutch footballer who plays as a midfielder for Eerste Divisie side FC Den Bosch.

Club career
Born in Schaijk, Van der Heijden played in the youth department of FC Den Bosch, where he has been playing in the reserve team since 2017. In early 2018, he was on the bench for a few games with the first team, but only made his debut two seasons later. This was on 12 August 2019, in the 2–2 away draw against Jong PSV. He came on for Jizz Hornkamp in the 79th minute.

On 23 April 2021, Van der Heijden scored his first professional goal in the 7–0 home thrashing of Roda JC Kerkrade. His goal was the third of the game, and came after an assist provided by Soufyan Ahannach.

References

External links
 Career stats & Profile - Voetbal International

1999 births
Living people
Dutch footballers
People from Landerd
Footballers from North Brabant
Association football midfielders
FC Den Bosch players
Eerste Divisie players